The 1998–99 Divizia B was the 59th season of the second tier of the Romanian football league system.

The format has been maintained to two series, each of them having 18 teams. At the end of the season, the winners of the series promoted to Divizia A and the last three places from both series relegated to Divizia C. A promotion play-off was played between the runners-up of the series to decide the third team that promoted to Divizia A.

Team changes

To Divizia B
Promoted from Divizia C
 Laminorul Roman
 Cimentul Fieni
 Rulmentul Alexandria
 Bihor Oradea
 Chimica Târnăveni
 Drobeta-Turnu Severin

Relegated from Divizia A
 Chindia Târgoviște
 Sportul Studențesc București
 Jiul Petroșani

From Divizia B
Relegated to Divizia C
 Metalul Plopeni
 CFR Cluj
 Dunărea Călărași
 UM Timișoara
 Foresta II Fălticeni
 Gloria Reșița

Promoted to Divizia A
 Astra Ploiești
 Olimpia Satu Mare
 FC Onești

Renamed teams
Electroputere Craiova was renamed as Extensiv Craiova.

Maramureș Baia Mare was renamed as FC Baia Mare.

League tables

Seria I

Seria II

Promotion play-off
The 2nd-placed teams of the Divizia B played a match to decide the third team promoted to Divizia A. The match was played on neutral ground, on the Cetate Stadium in Alba Iulia.

Top scorers 
17 goals
  Marian Ivan (FC Brașov)

15 goals
  Bogdan Vrăjitoarea (Rocar București)

13 goals
  Laurențiu Diniță (Sportul Studențesc)
  Adrian State (Dunărea Galați)

10 goals
  Cristian Dicu (Midia Năvodari)
  Claudiu Drăgan (UTA Arad)

9 goals

  Cornel Mihart (ARO Câmpulung)
  Gabriel Boștină (Cimentul Fieni)
  Marius Păcurar (Corvinul Hunedoara)
  Ionuț Savu (Rocar București)

8 goals
  Romeo Pădureț (Sportul Studențesc)
  Daniel Bona (Precizia Săcele)

7 goals

  Marcel Rus (Extensiv Craiova)
  Aurelian Dumitru (Sportul Studențesc)
  Cristian Albeanu (Bihor Oradea)
  Robert Niță (Cimentul Fieni)

See also 

1998–99 Divizia A
1998–99 Divizia D

References 

Liga II seasons
Rom
2